Balch Springs is a city in Dallas County, Texas, United States. It is an inner-ring suburb of Dallas and part of the Dallas–Fort Worth metroplex. Its population was 23,728 at the 2010 census, and 25,007 at 2019's census estimates.

History

The area was first settled in the 1840s. Around 1879, John M. Balch and his family settled south of Mesquite in unincorporated Dallas County. Mr. Balch found several springs on his land, one of which ran year-round. Local residents began referring to the springs on Mr. Balch's property as Balch Springs, and use of the name continued even after he moved away a few years after his arrival. Around 1885, a county school was named after the springs. A small church and a cemetery were near the school. During the early 1900s, the community was widely dispersed and consisted mostly of farms. Electricity, provided by Texas Power and Light, was introduced in 1939. Gas and telephone service arrived shortly after World War II.

The community began to grow rapidly along with the city of Dallas and other Dallas County towns. To avoid annexation by Dallas, Balch Springs incorporated as a city on June 13, 1953. The new city encompassed the communities of Balch Springs, Zipp City, Five Points, Jonesville, and Triangle, as well as portions of Rylie and Kleberg. A mayor-council form of government was adopted after incorporation. By 1956, Balch Springs had a population around 3,500. The city was home to 6,821 residents at the 1960 census. In September 1964, a post office opened in the city and in 1965, the first taxes were levied. A 1966 attempt to disincorporate the community was unsuccessful. By 1970, the population had risen to 10,464 as the construction of new roads made commuting to surrounding cities easier. In 1988, residents voted to become part of the neighboring city of Mesquite, but the election was declared invalid. Two years later, the 1990 census reported a total of 17,406 people living in the city. The 2000 population was 19,375.

The murder of Jordan Edwards occurred in Balch Springs in 2017.

Geography

Balch Springs is located at  (32.717381, –96.615154). The city is bordered by Mesquite to the north and east, and Dallas to the south and west.

Major highways running through Balch Springs include Interstate 635, which bisects the city into two nearly equal halves. Interstate 20 and U.S. Highway 175 run along Balch Springs' southern border.

Demographics

As of the 2020 United States census, 27,685 people, 6,916 households, and 5,522 families resided in the city.

Education

Public schools

The southwest portion of Balch Springs is served by Dallas Independent School District, while the northeast portion is served by Mesquite Independent School District. The two portions are roughly each one half of the city.

Mesquite Independent School District 
Mesquite ISD students living in Balch Springs are zoned to one of the following elementary schools, according to the following feeder patterns approved by the district in 2017.

Most Mesquite ISD students living in Balch Springs are zoned to A.C. New Middle School (grades 6–8, Balch Springs) and West Mesquite High School (9–12). Some MISD students (in the portion zoned to Gentry) are zoned to Berry Middle School (6–8) and John Horn High School. A small portion of Balch Springs (the portion zoned to Moss) is zoned to Agnew Middle School (7–8) and Mesquite High School.

Dallas Independent School District

Dallas ISD students are zoned to:
 Gilbert Cuellar Sr. Elementary School (PK–5)
 Richard Lagow Elementary School (PK–5)
 John W. Runyon Elementary School (PreK–5)
 Kleberg Elementary School (PreK–5)

Young Women's STEAM Academy at Balch Springs Middle School is in the city limits. The school, which opened in 2012, previously was a coeducational middle school serving most of the DISD portion, while other portions were zoned to Fred F. Florence Middle School. In the fall of 2016 Balch Springs was converted into a girls-only middle school; boys in its zone were zoned to Florence, now an all-boys school. Students from the former Balch Springs MS zone who wish to attend a coeducational middle school would go to E. B. Comstock Middle School, while those from the former Florence zone would go to Piedmont G.L.O.B.A.L. Academy (formerly John B. Hood Middle School) in Pleasant Grove. In addition Seagoville Middle School serves both genders in a portion of Balch Springs.

Prior to the opening of Balch Springs MS, Comstock and Florence served portions of the city.

H. Grady Spruce High School, W. W. Samuell High School, and Seagoville High School serve portions of the DISD area of Balch Springs.

Private schools

Balch Springs Christian Academy is a private school within the city limits that serves students from kindergarten to 12th grade, and uses the A Beka curriculum.  It is a subsidiary of Seagoville Road Baptist Church, which was established in 1974.  Ten members of the school and church died in a flood in central Texas in 1987.

Colleges and universities

Dallas County residents are zoned to Dallas College (formerly Dallas County Community College or DCCCD).

Public safety
Balch Springs Fire Department serves the city with one fire station, which runs one ladder truck, two engines, one fire chief, and three battalion chiefs. The department has a minimum manning of eight firefighters on shift 24/7. All firefighters are certified as EMTs or paramedics. Balch Springs has 30 professional firefighters, one chief, and an inspector. The Balch Springs Fire Department is a civil-service department. The department responds and manages all fire and emergent health calls.

The city maintains a police department.

Library
The Balch Springs Library-Learning Center is located at 12450 Elam Road in Balch Springs. The library, which has over 26,000 items, including over 25,000 books and over 1,000 audio and visual items, opened in April 2006.

Healthcare
Dallas ISD and Parkland Balch Springs Youth and Family Health Center is on a site next to the Balch Springs Middle School building, on the school property. It serves disadvantaged children who do not have primary care physicians. Previously, the center was known as the Spruce Youth and Family Health Center and was housed on the grounds of H. Grady Spruce High School in Dallas. On June 3, 2013, it moved to its current location.

References

External links
 City of Balch Springs official website

Cities in the Dallas–Fort Worth metroplex
Cities in Texas
Cities in Dallas County, Texas
Populated places established in 1953